Polina Dmitryevna Komar (born 4 November 1999) is a Russian synchronised swimmer. She won team gold medals at the 2020 Olympics, and all world and European championships between 2017 and 2020.

References

1999 births
Living people
Russian synchronized swimmers
World Aquatics Championships medalists in synchronised swimming
Artistic swimmers at the 2019 World Aquatics Championships
European Aquatics Championships medalists in synchronised swimming
Swimmers from Moscow
Synchronized swimmers at the 2020 Summer Olympics
Olympic synchronized swimmers of Russia
Olympic gold medalists for the Russian Olympic Committee athletes
Olympic medalists in synchronized swimming
Medalists at the 2020 Summer Olympics